Patiscus is a genus of crickets in the subfamily Euscyrtinae.  Species can be found in Asia, with records from India, China, Indo-China, the Philippines and New Guinea.

Species 
Patiscus includes the following species:
Patiscus brevipennis Chopard, 1969
Patiscus cephalotes Saussure, 1878
Patiscus dorsalis (Stål, 1877) - type species (as Euscirtus dorsalis Stål; locality: Philippines)
Patiscus elegans Otte, 2006
Patiscus maesoi Bolívar, 1889
Patiscus malayanus Chopard, 1969
Patiscus nagatomii Oshiro, 1999
Patiscus papuanus Gorochov, 1988
Patiscus quadripunctatus Bolívar, 1900
Patiscus tagalicus Stål, 1877
Patiscus thaiensis Ingrisch, 1987

References

External links
 

Ensifera genera
crickets
Orthoptera of Asia
Orthoptera of Indo-China